The following highways are numbered 149:

Canada
 Prince Edward Island Route 149

Costa Rica
 National Route 149

India
 National Highway 149 (India)

Japan
 Japan National Route 149

United States
 Alabama State Route 149
 Arkansas Highway 149
 California State Route 149
 Colorado State Highway 149
 Connecticut Route 149
 Florida State Road 149 (former)
 Georgia State Route 149
 Illinois Route 149
 Indiana State Road 149
 Iowa Highway 149
 K-149 (Kansas highway)
 Kentucky Route 149
 Louisiana Highway 149
 Maine State Route 149
 Massachusetts Route 149
 M-149 (Michigan highway)
 Minnesota State Highway 149
 Mississippi Highway 149
 Missouri Route 149
 New Hampshire Route 149
 New York State Route 149
 North Carolina Highway 149
 Ohio State Route 149
 Oklahoma State Highway 149
 Pennsylvania Route 149 (former)
 Tennessee State Route 149
 Texas State Highway 149
 Texas State Highway Loop 149
 Farm to Market Road 149 (Texas)
 Utah State Route 149
 Vermont Route 149
 Virginia State Route 149
 Wisconsin Highway 149 (former)
Territories:
 Puerto Rico Highway 149
 Puerto Rico Highway 149R